Rothschild's swift (Cypseloides rothschildi) is a Near Threatened species of bird in subfamily Cypseloidinae of the swift family Apodidae. It is found in Argentina and Bolivia.

Taxonomy and systematics

Rothschild's swift, white-chested swift, (Cypseloides lemosi), American black swift (C. niger), and sooty swift (C. fumigatus) form a superspecies. Some authors have treated Rothschild's and sooty swifts as conspecific. Rothschild's swift is monotypic.

Description

It has long, broad wings and a short squarish tail. Its plumage is a uniform medium brown.

Distribution and habitat

Rothschild's swift is found from Bolivia's Santa Cruz Department south into northwestern Argentina as far as Córdoba Province. There are no records in Peru despite its being included there in some taxonomic lists. The species' habitat requirements are not well known.

Behavior

Migration

Rothschild's swift appears to be a year-round resident in most of its range, though it might winter at the northern end of it.

Feeding

Like all swifts, Rothschild's is an aerial insectivore, but no details of its diet are known.

Breeding

Nothing is known about Rothschild's swift's breeding phenology.

Vocalization

As of late 2022, xeno-canto had a single recording of a Rothschild's swift vocalization, and the Cornell Lab of Ornithology's Macaulay Library had none. It reportedly makes a "short 'pip' or 'peep'" in flight.

Status

The IUCN has assessed Rothschild's swift as Near Threatened. It has a small range and an estimated population of 6000 to 15,000 mature individuals; the later is believed to be stable. Much of the Yungas forest where it lives has been logged or converted to agriculture. It does occur in some protected areas.

References

Rothschild's swift
Birds of the Southern Andean Yungas
Rothschild's swift
Rothschild's swift
Taxonomy articles created by Polbot